Tameh (also Romanized as Ţāmeh; also known as Tehāmi) is a village in Karkas Rural District, in the Central District of Natanz County, Isfahan Province, Iran. At the 2006 census, its population was 650, in 204 families.

References 

Populated places in Natanz County